Pay It may refer to:

 "Pay It", a song by Jeannie Ortega from No Place Like Brooklyn
 "Pay It", a song by Krokus from Painkiller

See also
 Pay it forward (disambiguation)